Abraham Pieter Marnus Hugo (born 24 September 1986) is a former South African rugby union footballer whose regular position was scrum-half.

After playing another three seasons for the Wellington-based side, he retired at the end of the 2016 season.

Durbanville-Bellville

In 2015, he joined Western Province club side Durbanville-Bellville and was a member of the squad that won the 2015 SARU Community Cup competition, scoring one tries in seven appearances in the competition.

References

Living people
1986 births
South African rugby union players
Rugby union scrum-halves
Sportspeople from Paarl
Griquas (rugby union) players
Cheetahs (rugby union) players
Boland Cavaliers players
Rugby union players from the Western Cape